The Clausura 2023 Liga MX final phase will be played between 6 May and 28 May 2023. A total of twelve teams will be competing in the final phase to decide the champions of the Clausura 2023 Liga MX season. For the sixth straight season, an additional qualifying round, the reclassification or repechaje, will be employed, which expanded the number of final phase spots to twelve. The winners of the reclassification matches will advance to the quarterfinals of the liguilla (mini league).

Qualified teams
The following teams qualified for the final phase.

In the following tables, the number of appearances, last appearance, and previous best result count only those in the short tournament era starting from Invierno 1996 (not counting those in the long tournament era from 1943–44 to 1995–96).

References

 
2
Liga MX seasons